The Grumman Kitten was a 1940s American cabin monoplane designed and built by Grumman. Two versions were built; the G-63 Kitten I with a retractable tailwheel landing gear, and G-72 Kitten II with a retractable nosewheel landing gear.

Development
In 1943, as part of the postwar plan for the company, Grumman started looking at entering the light aircraft market. The first design was the G-63 Kitten I which was an all-metal two/three-seat cabin monoplane with a retractable tailwheel landing gear and powered by a Lycoming O-290 piston engine. The aircraft first flew on 18 March 1944. Although testing continued, the aircraft did not enter production due to the continuing war effort. The original wing was replaced by a ducted mainplane to improve the lift/drag ratio.

On 4 February 1946, a version with a retractable nosewheel landing gear and dual controls, the G-72 Kitten II was flown. The Kitten II also has improvements to the wing and the original single vertical tail was changed to twin fins before the first flight, but reverted to the single fin after the first 28 hours of flight testing.

The development project was terminated in 1946, and the Kitten II was used as a company transport until it was retired in the mid-1960s. The sole surviving Kitten, it was restored and is now on display at the Cradle of Aviation Museum, Garden City, Long Island, New York.

Variants
G-63 Kitten I
Prototype with retractable tailwheel landing gear, one built.
G-72 Kitten II
Prototype with retractable nosewheel landing gear and dual controls, one built.
G-81
G-63 modified for ducted-wing tests.

Specifications (G-63 Kitten I)

See also

References
Notes

Bibliography

External links

Aerofiles - Grumman

Kitten
1940s United States civil utility aircraft
Single-engined tractor aircraft
Low-wing aircraft
Aircraft first flown in 1944
Twin-tail aircraft